Xu Ke may refer to:

Xu Ke (author) (1869–1928), Chinese author
Tsui Hark (born 1950), pinyin Xu Ke, Hong Kong film director